Rhonda Smith-Banchero (born May 1, 1973) is an American former basketball player. She played college basketball for the Washington Huskies where she graduated as the school's all-time leading scorer with 2,948 points and was inducted to the Husky Hall of Fame in 2004. She went on to play professionally for several seasons, including for the Sacramento Monarchs in the WNBA.

Personal life
Smith-Banchero is the mother of Paolo Banchero.

References

External links
WNBA statistics at Basketball Reference

1973 births
Living people
American expatriate basketball people in Israel
American expatriate basketball people in Italy
American expatriate basketball people in Taiwan
American expatriate basketball people in Turkey
American women's basketball players
Basketball players from Washington (state)
Centers (basketball)
Sacramento Monarchs players
Washington Huskies women's basketball players